Madison Jeffries is a superhero appearing in American comic books published by Marvel Comics. The character is depicted as having the ability to reshape plastic, metal, and glass to any shape desired. He also has the technopathic ability to mentally communicate with A.I., such as machines and robots. Madison Jeffries is the brother of Scramble.

Publication history
Madison Jeffries first appeared in Alpha Flight #16 (Nov. 1984), and was created by John Byrne.

Fictional character biography

Military service and Department H
As a young man, Madison Jeffries volunteered to enlist as a soldier in Vietnam alongside his younger brother Lionel. While Madison preferred not to use his mutant abilities to restructure metal, glass, and plastic, Lionel used his abilities to reshape organic materials to heal wounded soldiers. However, when Lionel attempted to use his powers to revive dead soldiers with grotesque results, he went insane, and Madison was forced to use his own powers to bind his brother. Lionel, as Scramble the Mixed-Up Man, was committed to a psychiatric ward in Montreal General Hospital, and Madison left the military.

Madison met and befriended a man named Roger Bochs at a clinic for physically disabled persons. The two became friends, and Madison used his mutant powers to help Bochs create his Box robot. They were discovered by Dr. James MacDonald Hudson, a.k.a. Weapon Alpha, and recruited into the new Alpha Flight program.

During the Canadian government's first sanctioning of Alpha Flight and its parent organization, Department H, Madison remained in the third-tier Gamma Flight program, while Bochs and his cybernetically-controlled robot, Box, reached the Beta Flight level. Madison had a fleeting relationship with fellow Gamma Flight member Diamond Lil, but the two would drift apart for some time. When the Canadian government cut Department H's funding, Madison left the organization completely and found employment digging ditches.

Roger Bochs and Omega Flight
While Madison was continuing with his own life, Box and Diamond Lil were subsequently recruited by Jerome Jaxon as members of Omega Flight, with the intention of destroying James Hudson, now known as Guardian, and Alpha Flight. However, Roger Bochs only accepted the offer of Jaxon's android assistant, Delphine Courtney, to defeat Omega Flight from within, as he remained loyal to Guardian. Jaxon would, as a result, use the Box robot himself against Guardian in battle, only to be electrocuted by the feedback in Box's control helmet when Guardian used his own suit's energy to disable the robot. Shortly thereafter, Guardian was uncontrollably thrust into the space-time continuum by his overloading battlesuit, appearing to have been disintegrated to his wife Heather.

After Alpha Flight returned to Canada, Roger Bochs (who was still working independently) recruited Madison to rebuild his damaged Box robot, to seek revenge against Omega Flight. Roger and Madison were able to reconfigure Box using a sort of "living metal", which allowed Bochs to physically merge with the robot, freeing him from his physical limitations. While Madison remained behind, Roger joined up with Alpha Flight, only to end up donating Box to the disembodied soul of Walter Langkowski, a.k.a. Sasquatch.

Shortly thereafter, Guardian reappeared in Vancouver, fighting an armored criminal. The rest of Alpha Flight was astonished to see their former leader alive, but it was a ruse; "Guardian" was, in fact, Delphine Courtney, reconfigured to duplicate the abilities of Guardian's battlesuit as well as his appearance. Courtney, acting as Guardian, led Alpha Flight to the West Edmonton Mall, where they encountered Omega Flight, looking for revenge, as well as to recover their lost member, Smart Alec.

Driven from the mall by the sudden appearance of the Beyonder, Omega Flight, led by Courtney disguised as Guardian, ran into Madison in the parking lot. Madison used his abilities to fend off the Omegan Flashback, inadvertently killing one of Flashback's future selves. He then turned to Courtney, forcing her to remove her Guardian mask, and then turned her inside out, destroying Courtney. Madison expressed his disappointment with Diamond Lil for turning criminal, and turned her and the rest of Omega Flight over to the authorities while he met up with Alpha Flight inside the mall, witnessing the Beyonder's departure.

Joining Alpha Flight
Madison and Roger worked together to reconstruct the interior of the house Walter Langkowski had inherited on Tamarind Island, which had been gutted by Walter's ancestor, Gilded Lily. The reconstructed house was dubbed "Mansion Alpha", and would serve as Alpha Flight's headquarters for a while.

Heather Hudson, having taken leadership of Alpha Flight during this period, researched her missing (and presumed deceased) husband's files on Madison Jeffries, and discovered the existence of his brother Lionel. The database made no mention of Lionel's madness, and when she traveled to the hospital where he was kept, she was surprised to find out that he was a patient, and not a staff member. Heather inadvertently allowed Lionel to use his powers, freeing himself and disfiguring Heather in the process. Madison was forced to confront Scramble once again, but this time Madison forced Lionel to use his power upon himself, allowing Scramble to regain a measure of sanity.

Madison and Roger re-created Guardian's battlesuit from the remains of Delphine Courtney as a side-project, much to Heather's dismay, as the suit had been responsible for her husband Mac's apparent demise. However, after the Scramble incident and being kidnapped by Deadly Ernest, Heather decided to don the battlesuit, modified by Madison to fit her, and took the name Vindicator.

Madison served Alpha Flight largely in a support role, rather than as an active combatant, by applying Roger Bochs' designs (and a few of his own, learning from Roger) to create and repair Alpha Flight's technological equipment, such as the Omnijet.

Madison was kidnapped by Kara Killgrave, the Purple Girl, when she feared reprisal from Alpha Flight for her manipulation of Northstar. However, Madison would soon take to looking after Kara as a sort of father figure for a time, in the absence of her biological father, the criminal known as the Purple Man. The fact that Kara would look up to Heather as a mother figure while a member of Alpha Flight may have also contributed to Madison and Heather's budding romance.

Against Lionel Jeffries
Lionel Jeffries had become the head of the New Life Clinic, where he used his mutant powers to heal injured Alphans. However, Lionel's mental instability had not been completely cured, and he had secretly begun experimenting again. Madison became suspicious when Lionel used his powers to radically alter Roger Bochs, severely reducing his body fat and giving him new legs, so that Bochs could impress teammate and girlfriend Aurora. Lionel's powers had no effect on the recently revived Sasquatch, who now inhabited the body of the recently deceased Snowbird, and could not affect the mysterious illness that had befallen Northstar, leading to growing doubts in the other Alphans, particularly Vindicator.

Despite the fact that Walter Langkowski was now in a female body (and having begun using the name Wanda Langkowski), Bochs still felt threatened by Aurora's former boyfriend. At the same time, Bochs's new legs were deteriorating, because they had been taken from corpses (and not Bochs's own mass as he had been led to believe). Driven to insane jealousy, Roger joined with Box and attacked Sasquatch. Kara was injured during the fight. Forced to defend the rest of the team against his friend, Madison forcibly removed Bochs from Box, taking control of the robot. In his paranoid state, Bochs began to believe that Madison had intended to take Box from him all along.

Bochs was taken back to the New Life Clinic, where Lionel would physically join with Roger to become the lifeform, Omega. The new being nearly devastated Alpha Flight with Lionel's metamorphic abilities combined with Roger's design ability. Madison, having picked up some of Roger Bochs's skills while working together, reconfigured the Box robot to be able to utilize Madison's own powers while merged, allowing Box to transform into any form Madison could imagine. Madison was finally able to reach what was left of Bochs's sanity long enough to cause Omega to stop its attack, and Madison, turning Box into a giant cannon, destroyed Omega.

Madison, Heather, and Lil
After losing several other members of Alpha Flight, the team consisted of three primary members: Vindicator, Box, and Sasquatch and junior members Purple Girl, Manikin, Goblyn, and Pathway. When the rest of the team was captured by Bedlam, a failed creation of Department H, Box teamed up with Wolverine to defeat Bedlam and save Alpha Flight. Soon after, Alpha Flight was attacked by the Great Beasts, and Box used Bedlam's Arctic base to increase his own size in order to physically battle Tundra. Shortly thereafter, Box discarded much of the matter absorbed from Bedlam's base in launching Alpha Flight into deep space, with his remaining body forming a starship. Alpha Flight would eventually return to Earth by way of the Dreamqueen's dimension.

During this time, Madison and Heather pursued a romantic relationship, and the two were engaged shortly after returning to Earth and disbanding Alpha Flight. However, the engagement was fraught with difficulty, as the Dreamqueen and subsequently Llan the Sorcerer forced Alpha Flight back together, and gave the two little time for romance.

It was during the final fight with the Dreamqueen that Lillian Crawley (a.k.a. Diamond Lil) re-entered Madison's life. Lil, having been paroled with the intention of being recruited into Canada's new official superteam, Gamma Flight, ended up fighting side-by-side with Alpha Flight instead. Although Madison reaffirmed his love for Heather during the final battle with Llan, the discovery that Guardian was, in fact, alive brought an end to the engagement.

After Alpha Flight had regained official status with the Canadian government, Madison and Lil remained with Alpha Flight for a time, fighting together as teammates. Madison provided support for Lil after she had discovered a lump in her breast; due to her virtually indestructible body, a biopsy was not possible with existing Earth technology, but an alien weapon recovered during an invasion of Toronto, modified by Madison, allowed a biopsy to be performed. The cyst proved benign, and shortly thereafter, Madison and Lil were married, after which they retired from active duty. They were pressed into service once more during the Infinity Crusade, before Alpha Flight was again disbanded as an active team.

Gemini and Weapon X
After a period of downtime, Alpha Flight was again reactivated, with a mysteriously younger James Hudson as leader of the team. Much to Lil's dismay, Madison rejoined the team, although this time not as Box. On the new team's first mission, however, the criminal organization the Zodiac kidnapped and brainwashed Madison, convincing him to become Gemini (with a modified Boxbot as his "twin"). Lil was kidnapped by Department H which conducted experiments on her.

Even after these events were rectified, more troubles occurred. Lil was once more kidnapped, but this time by the agents of the revamped Weapon X program and taken to their Neverland death camp. Madison was also kidnapped and brainwashed by the program as well. Its director, Malcolm Colcord, kept Madison in a small room in a secluded corner of the facility, commissioning him to create the Neverland camps. Madison was frequently brainwashed to keep him submissive to Colcord.

Due to a series of events within the organization, a schism was formed between Colcord and his second-in-command, Brent Jackson. Jackson gathered a contingent of loyal followers and attempted to usurp power from Colcord. In the midst of the commotion, Madison saved Colcord's life, escorting him and Aurora to safety, despite Colcord's abusive behavior towards him.

Madison Jeffries was one of the few mutants to retain their superhuman powers during the M-Day event.

X-Club
Jeffries is approached by Beast to join his scientist team that deals with the Mutant Birth Crisis because they need someone who is good with machinery. Jeffries claims he wanted to get away from people after being brainwashed into making Automated Mutant Death Camps, so he moved away to create and get smarter. His robots learn to adapt and self-replicate and decide they don't need him anymore. They seal off the bunker and try to kill him. He plants a bomb and joins Beast's team.

After Beast has finished gathering his science squad, they head back to base where he introduces them to their final member, Kavita Rao. Together they hold a meeting where Beast explains everything about how the Decimation occurred. He later goes back in time to the year 1906 along with the rest of the X-Club and Psylocke and helps raise Asteroid M from the bottom of the ocean. During the final battle against Norman Osborn's forces on Utopia, he teams up with Doctor Nemesis and Psylocke to take on Dark Beast.

Jeffries suffers a major loss during Necrosha, when Diamond Lil is killed by Mortis. Jeffries uses his abilities to craft a glass coffin for her and she is buried at sea. During the events of Second Coming, Madison and the rest of the X-Club are shut out of Utopia by Bastion as he attempts to kill off the remaining mutant population. Jeffries has developed an attraction to Danger, the humanoid-robotic manifestation of the X-Men's Danger Room.

Madison Jeffries later appears as a member of the Utopians alongside Elixir, Karma, Masque, Random, and Tabitha Smith.

Residing on Krakoa
He went on to join the mutant-only nation of Krakoa where he tried to take Danger with him but the island rejected the artificial home he tried to make her, as a result he was sent to the Pit of Exile by the Quiet Council for breaking the "Respect the sacred land of Krakoa" rule, alongside Nekra, Melter, Oya, and Third-Eye. They were greeted there by the Pit's then-sole resident: Sabretooth, who promised to torture them all as practice. Sabretooth at first tried to hunt them all down in his mental world, but after Third-Eye used his powers to break the illusion he convinced Victor that they weren't the ones he wanted to hunt down, he changed the illusion to make them all prison cellmates with Professor X and Magneto as the wardens. Victor began working on a plan for them to escape the pit, for which he taught them how to channel their consciousnesses through the island so they could manifest themselves on land. He sent everyone up the surface on missions to gather allies to help in their quest, a distrustful Madison decided to ignore his request and instead seek out his own ally, Skin. When a fight between Sabretooth and Melter almost kills everyone in the pit because it was controlled by his mind. Third-Eye saves everyone by dragging their consciousnesses to the astral plane while Krakoa fixes their bodies. They find themselves in a recreation of Sabretooth's childhood home with him there waiting for them, after having dinner together they all discussed what they did to get thrown in the pit and whether they deserved to be there. Shortly afterwards they met with Cypher who informed them that Sabretooth had betrayed them and escaped The Pit on his own. He offered them their own releases on two conditions, that they take fellow prisoners Nanny and Orphan-Maker and Toad, who had been hiding back in Sabretooth's Hell where they'd originally entered from and that the assembled team hunts down Sabretooth so he can be punished for his crimes. Jeffries then turns himself into a boat with the plastic in the ocean so the team can sail off the island after him. As the teams primary transportation, Maddison sailed the team to the Orchis created Noble Island where they abandoned the bodies of mutants they experimented on. Madison transformed from a boat into a giant robot to fight a super-powered Orchis Member, but he proved to strong for him and ripped him out of the robotic suit, before flying off with Orphan-Maker. Afterwards Sabretooth came by on his boat and smugly offered them a ride. Working very reluctantly with Sabertooth again, the team broke into another one of Orchis's secret bases to rescue Orphan. Maddison used his powers to turn their boat into a plane and communicated with the bases AI to get it's assistance, clashing with Sabretooth over his unwillingness to force the base into compliance. While inside they found a massive prison full of mutants and ran into Barrington's creation who was now fleeing in terror after Orphan-Maker took of his mask, killing Dr. Barrington with one look. The team then had to deal with Orphan-Maker who's X-Gene had finally activated and was about to cause the death of everyone in that base. Third-Eye came up with a plan to stop this that involved taking them all back to the Astral Plane, where Madison and Nanny could build him a new and better suit.

Powers and abilities
Madison Jeffries is a mutant gifted with the ability to technokinetically restructure all inorganic materials such as glass, plastic, and metal into anything within his imagination, including remote manipulation and control of devices made of such elements, even ones not of his own creation. Recently, his powers seem to have evolved a secondary mutation of full technopathy, being able to communicate with artificial intelligences such as machinery and robotics.

As a fringe benefit of his secondary mutation, Madison can technoformically merge with the Box armor. Gaining increased strength on a level with the Thing, stamina, and resistance to injury as well as an array of technological devices such as boot rockets, various scanners, and assorted weapons. Madison can reconfigure the Box armor to any form he can conceive, including various vehicle modes. Using Madison's powers, the Box armor can also absorb additional mechanical materials to increase its size and mass as needed. At maximum size he managed to fight evenly with Tundra, the strongest of the Great Beasts. However, while merged with Box, Madison can only transmute the armor itself, and must separate from Box to use his powers to affect other materials without absorbing them into the armor.

Similar to fellow mutant scientific specialists Forge, Doctor Nemesis or Sage. Mr. Jeffries has the natural intuitive talent for mechanical and cybernetic engineering which enables him to naturally understand, ascertain and implement the potential constructive formation that certain technological pieces can take. A trait which most telepaths remark as his mind working more like a computerized machine than that of a human being.

Other versions

Age of Apocalypse
In the "Age of Apocalypse" reality, Madison Jeffries joined Apocalypse's cause and was a member of the Brotherhood of Chaos, an elite religious group affiliated to the Church of the Madri. Jeffries was sent with the other members to prevent the Great Sentinel Airlift in Maine. However, a small squad of X-Men, the Amazing X-Men, had come to assist in the Sentinel Evacuation of Northern America. Box reprogrammed the Sentinels to target the X-Men, though the X-Men were later able to reverse Box's efforts. Box was able to conceal himself and pose as a human during the evacuation along with Copycat. They were discovered at a checkpoint and provided a distraction for the Reavers to pass through, but were subsequently hunted down by Weapon X and Jean Grey with the former slaying Box in the process.

Age of X-Man
In the "Age of X-Man" reality, Madison Jeffries is the History Instructor of the 10th Year class within the Summers Institute Of Higher Learning, located in Winchester, New York.

House of M
In the "House of M" reality, Madison Jeffries had also been forced by Weapon X to create weapons that would be used on his fellow mutants. His brother, Lionel, had also been a captive of the Weapon X program. Though the Jeffries brothers were eventually liberated when Magneto established himself as monarch, they both suffered from severe mental issues. Magneto found them embarrassing, so he did not keep the Jeffries brothers clos, yet he deemed them too valuable and resourceful to not make any use of them. As such, Magneto positioned in the Central American country of Santo Rico (after overthrowing the mutant El Toro) where they oversaw the mining of its precious metal ores. They ruled the country despotically and experimented on its residents for years until Hood's Masters of Evil invaded Santo Rico. Madison and Lionel both grow significantly in size and power by physically absorbing dozens of Santo Ricans and the mined minerals. Regardless, they were outnumbered by the Masters who killed the Jeffries brothers to conquer Santo Rico.

Weapon X: Days of Future Now
In the alternate future depicted in Weapon X: Days of Future Now, Madison's ever-improving Boxbots have gained a sentience of their own, one of them even calling itself Master Mold.

In other media
Madison Jeffries appears as an NPC in the video game Marvel Heroes, voiced by Richard Epcar. He appears at the Xavier Institute and helps prepare the Blackbird plane.

References

External links
 AlphaFlight.Net Alphanex Entry On - Madison Jeffries;
 MarvelDirectory.com - Character Bio - Madison Jeffries aka Box IV;
 Uncannyxmen.net Spotlight on Madison Jeffries;
 .

Characters created by John Byrne (comics)
Comics characters introduced in 1984
Fictional Canadian people
Fictional inventors
Fictional technopaths
Fictional United States Army personnel
Fictional Vietnam War veterans
Marvel Comics male superheroes
Marvel Comics military personnel
Marvel Comics mutants
Marvel Comics superheroes